The Koninklijke Algemeene Vereniging voor Bloembollencultuur, translated from Dutch as the Royal General Association for Bulb Culture, but more commonly known world-wide by the acronym of KAVB, is a trade association for the bulb horticulture sector, and was established in 1860. The association has a rural organization, within which regional groups and departments are active.

Mission 
The main activities of the association is its collective protection of members interests, and knowledge - and provision of information, and specialized service.

Membership 
The KAVB has approximately 2,200 members. Most of the members are independent entrepreneurs active in the introduction, production and trade of bulbs and bulbous flowers. The association represents the majority of participants in the Netherlands participating in the bulb sector.

Bulb sector 
The bulb sector in the Netherlands has a strong position on the world market. Approximately 70% of the world's production and 75% of the trade are realized in the Netherlands. Moreover, the production of bulbs and bulbous flowers abroad is mostly in Dutch hands. At the rural secretariat of the KAVB 20 employees are operative. The majority have daily contacts with members, and governments. Regional secretaries support the association work for the departments and groups in the various regions.

International Cultivar Registration Authority (ICRA)
The KAVB acts as the International Cultivar Registration Authority (ICRA) for all Bulbous, cormous and tuberous-rooted ornamental plants, excluding Dahlia Cav., Lilium L., Narcissus L., Nerine Herb. and various Australian genera (1955)

The full list is as follows:

 Albuca L.
 Allium L.
 Alophia Herb.
 Alrawia (Wendelbo) K. Persson & Wendelbo
 Alstroemeria L.
 Amarcrinum Coutts
 Amarine Sealy
 Amarygia Cif. & Giacom.
 Amaryllis L.
 Ammocharis Herb.
 Amphisiphon W. F. Barker
 Ancrumia Harv. ex Baker
 Androcymbium Willd.
 Androsiphon Schltr.
 Anemone L.
 Anomatheca Ker Gawl.
 Antholyza L.
 Babiana Ker Gawl. ex Sims
 Baeometra Salisb. ex Endl.
 Belamcanda Adans.
 Bellevalia Lapeyr.
 Bessera Schult. f.
 Bloomeria Kellogg
 Bobartia L.
 Bomarea Mirb.
 Boophane Herb.
 Bowiea Harv. ex Hook. f.
 Brimeura Salisb.
 Brodiaea Sm.
 Brunscrinum anon.
 Brunserine Traub
 Brunsvigia Heist.
 Bulbine Wolf
 Bulbinella Kunth
 Bulbocodium L.
 Caliphruria Herb.
 Calla L.
 Calochortus Pursh
 Caloscordum Herb.
 Camassia Lindl.
 Camptorrhiza Hutch.
 Canna L.
 Chasmanthe N. E. Br.
 Chionodoxa Boiss.
 Chlidanthus Herb.
 Chlorogalum Kunth
 Colchicum L.
 Corydalis DC.
 Crinum L.
 Crocosmia Planch.
 Crocus L.
 Curculigo Gaertn.
 Cypella Herb.
 Cyrtanthus Aiton
 Daubenya Lindl.
 Dichelostemma Kunth
 Dierama K. Koch
 Dietes Salisb. ex Klatt
 Dipcadi Medik.
 Drimia Jacq. ex Willd.
 Drimiopsis Lindl. & Paxton
 Elisena Herb.
 Eranthis Salisb.
 Eremurus M. Bieb.
 Erythronium L.
 Eucharis Planch. & Linden
 Eucomis L'Hér.
 Eucrosia Ker Gawl.
 Eustephia Cav.
 Ferraria Burm. ex Mill.
 Fortunatia J. F. Macbr.
 Freesia Klatt
 Fritillaria L.
 Fumaria L.
 Galanthus L.
 Galaxia Thunb.
 Galtonia Decne.
 Geissorhiza Ker Gawl.
 Gelasine Herb.
 Gilliesia Lindl.
 Gladiolus L.
 Gloriosa L.
 Griffinia Ker Gawl.
 Gynandriris Parl.
 Habranthus Herb.
 Haemanthus L.
 Hannonia Braun-Blanq. & Maire
 Hastingsia S. Watson
 Hepatica Mill.
 Herbertia Sweet
 Hermodactylus Mill.
 Hesperantha Ker Gawl.
 Hesperocallis A. Gray
 Hexacyrtis Dinter
 Hippeasprekelia anon.
 Hippeastrum Herb.
 Homeria Vent.
 Hyacinthella Schur
 Hyacinthoides Heist. ex Fabr.
 Hyacinthus L.
 Hymenocallis Salisb.
 Hypoxis L.
 Ipheion Raf.
 Iphigenia Kunth
 Iris L.
 Ixia L.
 Ixiolirion Herb.
 Korolkowia Regel
 Lachenalia J. Jacq. ex Murray
 Lapeirousia Pourr.
 Lapiedra Lag.
 Ledebouria Roth
 Leopoldia Parl.
 Leucocoryne Lindl.
 Leucojum L.
 Litanthus Harv.
 Littonia Hook.
 Lloydia Rchb.
 Lycoris Herb.
 Massonia Thunb. ex Houtt.
 Melasphaerula Ker Gawl.
 Merendera Ramond
 Milla Cav.
 Molineria Colla
 Moraea Mill.
 Muilla S. Watson ex Benth.
 Muscari Mill.
 Muscarimia Kostel. ex Losinsk.
 Nectaroscordum Lindl.
 Neodregea C. H. Wright
 Neomarica Herb.
 Neopatersonia Schonl.
 Notholirion Wall. ex Boiss.
 Nothoscordum Kunth
 Onixotis Raf.
 Ornithogalum L.
 Ornithoglossum Salisb.
 Oxalis L.
 Pamianthe Stapf
 Pancratium L.
 Paramongaia Velarde
 Pardanthopsis (Hance) L. W. Lenz
 Phaedranassa Herb.
 Polyxena Kunth
 Pseudogaltonia (Kuntze) Engl.
 Pseudomuscari Garbari & Greuter
 Puschkinia Adams
 Ranunculus L.
 Rhadamanthus Salisb.
 Rhodocodon Baker
 Rhodohypoxis Nel
 Rhodophiala C. Presl
 Rhodoxis anon.
 Rigidella Lindl.
 Roscoea Sm.
 Sandersonia Hook.
 Scadoxus Raf.
 Schizobasis Baker
 Schizostylis Backh. & Harv.
 Schoenolirion Torr.
 Scilla L.
 Simethis Kunth
 Solenomelus Miers
 Sparaxis Ker Gawl.
 Sprekelia Heist.
 Stenomesson Herb.
 Sternbergia Waldst. & Kit.
 Sypharissa Salisb.
 Syringodea Hook.
 Tecophilaea Bertero ex Colla
 Thuranthos C. H. Wright
 Tigridia Juss.
 Trimezia Salisb. ex Herb.
 Tristagma Poepp.
 Triteleia Douglas ex Lindl.
 Tritonia Ker Gawl.
 Tulbaghia L.
 Tulipa L.
 Urceolina Roxb.
 Urginea Steinh.
 Vagaria Herb.
 Veltheimia Gled.
 Watsonia Mill.
 Whiteheadia Harv.
 Wurmbea Thunb.
 Zantedeschia Spreng.
 Zephyranthes Herb.
 Zigadenus sensu lato, including Amianthium, Anticlea, Stenanthium, Toxicoscordion and Zigadenus sensu stricto.

External links
  Royal General Bulbgrowers' Association (KAVB)
 International Cultivar Registration Authorities (ICRAs)

Organizations established in 1860
Trade associations based in the Netherlands
Horticultural organizations
Cannaceae
1860 establishments in the Netherlands
Horticulture in the Netherlands